The Symphony No. 1 in E minor, Op. 39, by Jean Sibelius is a symphony  started in 1898, and finished in early 1899, when Sibelius was 33. The work was first performed on 26 April 1899 by the Helsinki Orchestral Society, conducted by the composer, in an original version which has not survived.  After the premiere, Sibelius made some revisions, resulting in the version performed today. The revised version was completed in the spring and summer of 1900, and was first performed in Berlin by the Helsinki Philharmonic, conducted by Robert Kajanus on 1 July 1900.

The symphony is characterized by its use of string and woodwind solos; the first movement opens with a long and discursive clarinet solo over a timpani roll; (this idea returns at the start of the fourth movement, fortissimo in the strings, with wind and brass chordal accompaniment), and subsequent movements include violin, viola, and cello solos.

Most performances of the work last between 35 and 40 minutes.  Many conductors choose to slacken the speeds suggested by Sibelius's metronome markings, particularly in the fast part (allegro energico) of the first movement. Because of this, many versions of the symphony are about 38–40 minutes long (the publishers suggest the duration is 40 minutes). In Osmo Vänskä's recording of the work, released in 1997, the first movement is played at the metronome mark suggested by Sibelius and takes 9:42 (compared with the – minute duration of most other recordings).

Instrumentation
2 flutes (both doubling on piccolo), 2 oboes, 2 clarinets (1st and 4th movements in A, 2nd and 3rd in B), 2 bassoons, 4 horns, 3 trumpets, 3 trombones, tuba, timpani, triangle, bass drum, cymbals, harp, and strings

Movements

Like most symphonies, it is in four movements:

The first recording was made by Robert Kajanus with the London Symphony Orchestra for the HMV label in May 1930.

References

External links

Article
Flying Inkpot Review

Symphony 1
1899 compositions
1900 compositions
Compositions in E minor